The Italy women's national water polo team represents Italy in international women's water polo competitions and friendly matches. The team is one of the leading teams in Europe since the mid-1990s, claiming the title at the 2004 Summer Olympics in Athens, Greece. The squad is nicknamed the Setterosa.

Palmarès

Results

Olympic Games

Olympic Year Tournament
 1996 –  Bronze medal

World Championship

 1994 –  Bronze medal
 1998 –  Gold medal
 2001 –  Gold medal
 2003 –  Silver medal
 2005 – 7th place
 2007 – 5th place
 2011 – 4th place
 2013 – 10th place
 2015 –  Bronze medal
 2017 – 6th place
 2019 – 6th place
 2022 – 4th place

FINA World Cup

 1989 – 8th place
 1991 – 5th place
 1993 –  Silver medal
 1995 – 5th place
 1997 – 4th place
 1999 –  Bronze medal
 2002 – 5th place
 2006 –  Silver medal

FINA World League

 2004 –  Bronze medal
 2005 – 8th place
 2006 –  Silver medal
 2009 – 8th place
 2011 –  Silver medal
 2012 – 8th place
 2013 – 6th place
 2014 –  Silver medal
 2015 – 7th place
 2016 – 5th place
 2022 – 5th place

European Championship

 1989 – 4th place
 1991 –  Bronze medal
 1993 – 4th place
 1995 –  Gold medal
 1997 –  Gold medal
 1999 –  Gold medal
 2001 –  Silver medal
 2003 –  Gold medal
 2006 –  Silver medal
 2008 – 4th place
 2010 – 4th place
 2012 –  Gold medal
 2014 – 4th place
 2016 –  Bronze medal
 2018 – 6th place
 2020 – 5th place
 2022 –  Bronze medal

LEN Europa Cup

Team

Current squad
Roster for the 2020 Women's European Water Polo Championship.

Head coach: Paolo Zizza

Past squads

 1991 European Championship –  Bronze Medal
Nicoletta Abbate, Carmela Allucci, Monica Canetti, Cristina Consoli, Francesca Conti, Antonella Di Giacinto, Stefania Lariucci, Sonia Magarelli, Giusi Malato, Neira Marsili, Martina Miceli, Monica Petrucci, Monica Vaillant, Flavia Villa, and Claudia Vinciguerra. Head Coach: Roberto Fiori.

 1993 FINA World Cup –  Silver Medal
Nicoletta Abbate, Carmela Allucci, Cristina Consoli, Francesca Conti, Antonella Di Giacinto, Melania Grego, Stefania Lariucci, Giusi Malato, Claudia Mori, Paola Sabbatini, Greta Righi, Monica Vaillant, and Claudia Vinciguerra.

 1994 World Championship –  Bronze Medal
Nicoletta Abbate, Carmela Allucci, Cristina Consoli, Francesca Conti, Antonella Di Giacinto, Melania Grego, Stefania Lariucci, Giusi Malato, Martina Miceli, Paola Sabbatini, Oriana Di Siena, Monica Vaillant, and Milena Virzì.

 1995 European Championship –  Gold Medal
Carmela Allucci, Marica Carrozzi, Cristina Consoli, Francesca Conti, Antonella Di Giacinto, Melania Grego, Stefania Lariucci, Giusi Malato, Martina Miceli, Maddalena Musumeci, Francesca Romano, Paola Sabbatini, Daria Starace, Monica Vaillant, and Milena Virzì. Head Coach: Pierluigi Formiconi.

 1996 Olympic Year Tournament –  Bronze Medal
Carmela Allucci, Alexandra Araujo, Cristina Consoli, Francesca Conti, Antonella Di Giacinto, Melania Grego, Stefania Lariucci, Giusi Malato, Martina Miceli, Silvia Moriconi, Maddalena Musumeci, Monica Vaillant, and Milena Virzì. Head Coach: Pierluigi Formiconi.

 1997 European Championship –  Gold Medal
Carmela Allucci, Alexandra Araujo, Cristina Consoli, Francesca Conti, Antonella Di Giacinto, Melania Grego, Stefania Lariucci, Stefania Lavorini, Giusi Malato, Martina Miceli, Silvia Moriconi, Maddalena Musumeci, Cinzia Ragusa, Monica Vaillant, and Milena Virzì. Head Coach: Pierluigi Formiconi.

 1998 World Championship –  Gold Medal
Carmela Allucci, Alexandra Araujo, Cristina Consoli, Francesca Conti, Eleonora Gay, Antonella Di Giacinto, Melania Grego, Stefania Lariucci, Giusi Malato, Martina Miceli, Maddalena Musumeci, Monica Vaillant, and Milena Virzi. Head Coach: Pierluigi Formiconi.

 1999 FINA World Cup –  Bronze Medal
Carmela Allucci, Alexandra Araujo, Tatiana Baianova, Cristina Consoli, Francesca Conti, Eleonora Gay, Melania Grego, Tania di Mario, Martina Miceli, Maddalena Musumeci, Gabriella Sciolti, Monica Vaillant, and Claudia Vinciguerra. Head Coach: Pierluigi Formiconi.

 1999 European Championship –  Gold Medal
Carmela Allucci, Alexandra Araujo, Tatiana Baianova, Silvia Bosurgi, Cristina Consoli, Francesca Conti, Tania di Mario, Melania Grego, Giusi Malato, Martina Miceli, Silvia Moriconi, Maddalena Musumeci, Martina Schiavon, Gabriella Sciolti, and Monica Vaillant. Head Coach: Pierluigi Formiconi.

 2001 European Championship –  Silver Medal
Simona Abbate, Carmela Allucci, Alexandra Araujo, Silvia Bosurgi, Cristina Consoli, Francesca Conti, Melania Grego, Tania Di Mario, Giusi Malato, Martina Miceli, Maddalena Musumeci, Cinzia Ragusa, Gabriella Sciolti, Paola Sabbatini, and Manuela Zanchi. Head Coach: Pierluigi Formiconi.

 2001 World Championship –  Gold Medal
Carmela Allucci, Alexandra Araujo, Silvia Bosurgi, Cristina Consoli, Francesca Conti, Melania Grego, Giusi Malato, Tania di Mario, Martina Miceli, Maddalena Musumeci, Paola Sabbatini, Gabriella Sciolti, and Monica Vaillant. Head Coach: Pierluigi Formiconi.

 2001 Holiday Cup –  Bronze Medal
Carmela Allucci, Alexandra Araujo, Silvia Bosurgi, Francesca Conti, Cristina Consoli, Melania Grego, Giusi Malato, Tania di Mario, Martina Miceli, Maddalena Musumeci, Paola Sabbatini, Gabriella Sciolti, and Monica Vaillant.

 2003 European Championship –  Gold Medal
Carmela Allucci, Alexandra Araujo, Silvia Bosurgi, Francesca Conti, Melania Grego, Erika Lava, Daniela Lavorini, Giusi Malato, Tania di Mario, Martina Miceli, Maddalena Musumeci, Cinzia Ragusa, Gabriella Sciolti, Noémi Tóth, and Manuela Zanchi.

 2003 World Championship –  Silver Medal
Carmela Allucci, Alexandra Araujo, Silvia Bosurgi, Francesca Conti, Melania Grego, Erika Lava, Giusi Malato, Tania di Mario, Martina Miceli, Maddalena Musumeci, Cinzia Ragusa, Noémi Tóth, and Manuela Zanchi.

 2003 Holiday Cup –  Silver Medal
Carmela Allucci, Alexandra Araujo, Silvia Bosurgi, Francesca Conti, Elena Gigli, Melania Grego, Daniela Lavorini, Tania di Mario, Martina Miceli, Maddalena Musumeci, Cinzia Ragusa, Gabriella Sciolti, Noémi Tóth, and Manuela Zanchi.

 2004 Olympic Qualifying Tournament
Carmela Allucci, Alexandra Araujo, Silvia Bosurgi, Francesca Conti, Elena Gigli, Melania Grego, Giusi Malato, Tania di Mario, Martina Miceli, Maddalena Musumeci, Cinzia Ragusa, Noémi Tóth, and Manuela Zanchi.

 2004 FINA World League –  Bronze Medal
 Carmela Allucci, Francesca Conti, Martina Miceli, Silvia Bosurgi, Erika Lava, Manuela Zanchi, Tania di Mario, Cinzia Ragusa, Giusi Malato, Alexandra Araujo, Maddalena Musumeci, Melania Grego, Noémi Tóth, and Simona Abbate.

 2004 Holiday Cup –  Silver Medal
 Carmela Allucci, Francesca Conti, Martina Miceli, Silvia Bosurgi, Erika Lava, Manuela Zanchi, Tania di Mario, Cinzia Ragusa, Giusi Malato, Alexandra Araujo, Maddalena Musumeci, Melania Grego, Noémi Tóth, and Simona Abbate.

 2004 Olympic Games –  Gold Medal
 Carmela Allucci, Francesca Conti, Martina Miceli, Silvia Bosurgi, Elena Gigli, Manuela Zanchi, Tania di Mario, Cinzia Ragusa, Giusi Malato, Alexandra Araujo, Maddalena Musumeci, Melania Grego, and Noémi Tóth.

 2006 FINA World League –  Silver Medal
 Eleonora Gay, Martina Miceli, Francesca Pavan, Silvia Bosurgi, Erzsébet Valkai, Manuela Zanchi, Tania di Mario, Cinzia Ragusa, Daria Storace, Federica Rocco, Maddalena Musumeci, Teresa Frassinetti, and Elena Gigli.

 2006 FINA World Cup –  Silver Medal
 Silvia Bosurgi, Eleonora Gay, Elena Gigli, Teresa Frassinetti, Tania di Mario, Martina Miceli, Maddalena Musumeci, Francesca Pavan, Cinzia Ragusa, Federica Rocco, Daria Starace, Erzsébet Valkai, and Manuela Zanchi.

 2006 European Championship –  Silver Medal
 Silvia Bosurgi, Chiara Brancati, Teresa Frassinetti, Arianna Garibotti, Elena Gigli, Allegra Lapi, Tania di Mario, Martina Miceli, Maddalena Musumeci, Francesca Pavan, Federica Radicchi, Cinzia Ragusa, Federica Rocco, Erzsébet Valkai, and Manuela Zanchi.

 2007 Holiday Cup –  Gold Medal
 Annalisa Bosello, Silvia Bosurgi, Elisa Casanova, Marta Colaiocco, Teresa Frassinetti, Eleonora Gay, Elena Gigli, Tania di Mario, Martina Miceli, Maddalena Musumeci, Francesca Pavan, Cinzia Ragusa, Erzsébet Valkai, and Manuela Zanchi. Head Coach: Mauro Maugeri.

 2008 FINA Olympic Qualifying Tournament –  Gold Medal
 Elena Gigli, Martina Miceli, Elisa Casanova, Silvia Bosurgi, Erzsébet Valkai, Manuela Zanchi, Tania di Mario, Cinzia Ragusa, Marta Colaiocco, Federica Rocco, Maddalena Musumeci, Teresa Frassinetti, and Chiara Brancati. Head Coach: Mauro Maugeri.

 2012 European Championship –  Gold Medal
Elena Gigli, Simona Abbate, Elisa Casanova, Rosaria Aiello, Elisa Queirolo, Allegra Lapi, Tania Di Mario, Roberta Bianconi, Giulia Emmolo, Giulia Rambaldi, Aleksandra Cotti, Teresa Frassinetti and Giulia Gorlero. Head Coach: Fabio Conti.

 2015 World Championship –  Bronze Medal
Giulia Gorlero, Chiara Tabani, Arianna Garibotti, Elisa Queirolo, Federica Radicchi, Rosaria Aiello, Tania di Mario, Roberta Bianconi, Giulia Emmolo, Francesca Pomeri, Laura Barzon, Teresa Frassinetti, and Laura Teani. Head Coach: Fabio Conti.

 2016 European Championship –  Bronze Medal
Giulia Gorlero, Chiara Tabani, Arianna Garibotti, Elisa Queirolo, Federica Radicchi, Rosaria Aiello, Tania di Mario, Roberta Bianconi, Giulia Emmolo, Francesca Pomeri, Aleksandra Cotti, Teresa Frassinetti, and Laura Teani. Head Coach: Fabio Conti.

Under-20 team
Italy lastly competed at the 2021 FINA Junior Water Polo World Championships where they finished fourth.

See also
 Italy women's Olympic water polo team records and statistics
 Italy men's national water polo team
 List of Olympic champions in women's water polo
 List of women's Olympic water polo tournament records and statistics
 List of world champions in women's water polo

References

External links

FINA
Squads

Women's water polo in Italy
Women's national water polo teams